This article details the qualifying phase for diving at the 2019 Pan American Games. The competition at these Games comprised a total of 70 athletes coming from 12 different nations; each was allowed to enter no more than 8 divers if entering teams into the synchronized diving events, or 6 divers if not. A maximum of two divers per event per NOC was enforced, and divers were allowed to enter into multiple events.

Summary
The top twenty divers from the South American Swimming Championships along with the top twenty from the Central American and Caribbean Games and the Central American and Caribbean Swimming Championships combined qualified, with the remaining 14 places from Zone 1 and 2 being made up according to FINA rankings. Eight divers also qualified from Zones 3 and 4 (USA and Canada respectively) according to National Championships or trials held by the country.

Please note: Athletes could enter multiple events and therefore the numbers below are the number of entries each NOC made, not the number of athletes participating.

 'X' indicates a team of 2 divers

Panam Sports final list - 1 August 2019

Timeline

References

Qualification for the 2019 Pan American Games
2018 in diving
2019 in diving
Qualification